Piołunówka is a very bitter alcoholic infusion (Polish: "nalewka") made by macerating wormwood in alcohol. Its name comes from piołun, which means wormwood in Polish. It is becoming popular due to the recent absinthe revival but has been well known before absinthe.  It differs from absinthe because it is macerated and rarely distilled (see the recipe below), whereas absinthe is additionally distilled. Piołunówka is not simply an amateur's version of absinthe but can be perceived as its predecessor. For centuries wormwood-based elixirs have been used as digestive aids and disease preventatives.

Thujone 

Piołunowka has much higher levels of thujone than absinthe because it is not distilled. Many people produce it today to try to feel the "absinthe effect" because of its higher thujone levels, although it is not well known how thujone plays a role in these purported effects and in fact is a known poison.

In Poland Piołunówka is considered a cure for problems with digestive tract and is believed to enhance appetite. Therefore, traditionally it is consumed in small amounts.

Availability 

Piołunówka is typically hard to find outside of Poland, while wormwood is available at many herb stores, it is not always of sufficient quality for making piołunówka.

Ingredients 

Apart from fresh wormwood usually some other ingredients are used such as: peppercorns, black tea, raisins, honey, geranium leaves and hypericum flowers. All herbs used should be freshly picked, not dried (apart from tea). The alcohol used is plain vodka or spirit. It can be easily produced at home, as it is generally speaking an alcohol in which herbs and other ingredients were soaked over a period of about 2 weeks and then filtered. It does not require aging.

History 

The recipe dates back to at least the 16th century, as Piołunówka is described in Stefan Falimierz' 1534 opus On Herbs and Their Potency (O ziolach y o moczy ich). As such, it has traditionally been made in noble manors, though the recipes might have varied in their ingredients and preparations. The last widely available piołunówka was distilled in Lwów by J. A. Baczewski distillery up to 1939. The modern version appeared with the same label released by Polmos in Stargard Gdański who discontinued the production in the 1990s.

References

Cieślak, J. "Domowy wyrób win", Watra, Warszawa 1999, pp. (273–274)

Falimierz, S. "O paleniu wódek z ziół", Kraków 1534

Kurowski, J., N., "Wypalanie wódki", A. Brzezina i Komp., Warszawa 1829

Piątkowski, A. "Gorzelnik i piwowar doskonały", Groblowskiey Drukarnia, Kraków 1808

See also 
 Malört

Absinthe
Polish alcoholic drinks